Gnaphaliothamnus is a genus of flowering plants in the family Asteraceae.

References

Gnaphalieae
Asteraceae genera